The 2021 Fairfield Stags baseball team represented Fairfield University during the 2021 NCAA Division I baseball season. The Stags played their home games at Alumni Baseball Diamond as a member of the Metro Atlantic Athletic Conference. They were led by head coach Bill Currier, in his 10th season at Fairfield.

Fairfield qualified for the NCAA tournament for the first time since 2016, and qualified for the first time ever as an at-large team. They reached the Austin Regional final, before losing to Texas.

Previous season

The 2020 Fairfield Stags baseball team notched a 2–9 (0–0) regular season record. The season prematurely ended on March 12, 2020 due to concerns over the COVID-19 pandemic.

Game log 

! colspan=2 style="" | Regular season (33–1)
|-

|- align="center" bgcolor="ddffdd"
| March 20 || 11:30 am || SSN ||  || || Alumni Baseball Diamond || W 7–4 || McLoughlin (1–0) || Warner (0–1) || Grabek (1) || 26 || 1–0 || 1–0 || Report
|- align="center" bgcolor="ddffdd"
| March 20 || 2:15 pm || SSN || Canisius || || Alumni Baseball Diamond || W 13–4 || Sansone (1–0) || Barberio (0–1) || — || 25 || 2–0 || 2–0 || Report
|- align="center" bgcolor="ddffdd"
| March 21 || 11:30 am || SSN || Canisius || || Alumni Baseball Diamond || W 6–3 || Signore (1–0) || Frank (0–1) || Cafaro (1) || 50 || 3–0 || 3–0 || Report
|- align="center" bgcolor="ddffdd"
| March 21 || 2:15 pm || SSN || Canisius || || Alumni Baseball Diamond || W 8–0 || Noviello (1–0) || Fron (0–1) || — || 50 || 4–0 || 4–0 || Report
|-

|- align="center" bgcolor="ddffdd"
| April 2 || 12:00 pm || SSN ||  || || Alumni Baseball Diamond || W 4–2 || Sansone (2–0) || Smith (1–2) || — || 25 || 5–0 || 5–0 || Report
|- align="center" bgcolor="ddffdd"
| April 2 || 2:30 pm || SSN || Iona || || Alumni Baseball Diamond || W 4–2 || Noviello (2–0) || Helmstetter (1–1) || Grabek (2) || 25 || 6–0 || 6–0 || Report
|- align="center" bgcolor="ddffdd"
| April 3 || 12:00 pm || SSN || Iona || || Alumni Baseball Diamond || W 7–0 || Signore (2–0) || Helmstetter (1–2) || — || 25 || 7–0 || 7–0 || Report
|- align="center" bgcolor="ddffdd"
| April 3 || 2:30 pm || SSN || Iona || || Alumni Baseball Diamond || W 10–2 || McVeigh (1–0) || Martin (1–2) || — || 25 || 8–0 || 8–0 || Report
|- align="center" bgcolor="ddffdd"
| April 7 || 12:00 pm || SSN ||  || || Alumni Baseball Diamond || W 6–3 || Grabek (1–0) || DeCarr (0–2) || Oliphant (1) || 25 || 9–0 || 9–0 || Report
|- align="center" bgcolor="ddffdd"
| April 7 || 3:00 pm || SSN || Quinnipiac || || Alumni Baseball Diamond || W 17–6  || Amone (1–0) || Mazza (0–1) || — || 25 || 10–0 || 10–0 || Report
|- align="center" bgcolor="ddffdd"
| April 9 || 12:00 pm || SSN ||  || || Alumni Baseball Diamond || W 8–3 || Sansone (3–0) || Audrey (2–2) || — || 20 || 11–0 || 11–0 || Report
|- align="center" bgcolor="ddffdd"
| April 9 || 3:00 pm || SSN || Rider || || Alumni Baseball Diamond || W 10–0 || Noviello (3–0) || Soporowski (3–1) || — || 20 || 12–0 || 12–0 || Report
|- align="center" bgcolor="ddffdd"
| April 10 || 12:00 pm || SSN || Rider || || Alumni Baseball Diamond || W 5–0 || Signore (3–0) || Doelling (2–1) || — || 35 || 13–0 || 13–0 || Report
|- align="center" bgcolor="ddffdd"
| April 10 || 3:00 pm || SSN || Rider || || Alumni Baseball Diamond || W 6–0 || Cafaro (1–0) || Williamson (1–1) || — || 35 || 14–0 || 14–0 || Report
|- align="center" bgcolor="ddffdd"
| April 14 || 12:00 pm || SSN || Quinnipiac || || Alumni Baseball Diamond || W 2–1 || Grabek (2–0) || Donnelly (2–2) || — || 30 || 15–0 || 15–0 || Report
|- align="center" bgcolor="ddffdd"
| April 14 || 3:00 pm || SSN || Quinnipiac || || Alumni Baseball Diamond || W 5–2 || Oliphant (1–0) || Mazza (0–2) || Sansone (1) || 30 || 16–0 || 16–0 || Report
|- align="center" bgcolor="ddffdd"
| April 17 || 12:00 pm || SSN ||  || || Alumni Baseball Diamond || W 3–2 || Sansone (4–0) || Klepchick (2–2) || — || 45 || 17–0 || 17–0 || Report
|- align="center" bgcolor="ddffdd"
| April 17 || 3:00 pm || SSN || Monmouth || || Alumni Baseball Diamond || W 8–2 || Noviello (4–0) || Dombroski (2–1) || — || 40 || 18–0 || 18–0 || Report
|- align="center" bgcolor="ddffdd"
| April 18 || 12:00 pm || SSN || Monmouth || || Alumni Baseball Diamond || W 4–3 || Oliphant (2–0) || Miller (0–1) || — || 40 || 19–0 || 19–0 || Report
|- align="center" bgcolor="ddffdd"
| April 18 || 3:00 pm || SSN || Monmouth || || Alumni Baseball Diamond || W 4–1 || Cafaro (2–0) || Long (2–1) || Grabek (3) || 45 || 20–0 || 20–0 || Report
|- align="center" bgcolor="ddffdd"
| April 21 || 12:00 pm || || at  || || Joseph Jaroschak Field || W 20–2 || Ostensen (2–0) || Mahady (2–2) || — || 45 || 21–0 || 21–0 || Report
|- align="center" bgcolor="ddffdd"
| April 21 || 3:00 pm || || at Saint Peter's || || Joseph Jaroschak Field || W 9–0 ||colspan="4"|Forfeit || 22–0 || 22–0 || Report
|- align="center" bgcolor="ddffdd"
| April 23 || 12:00 pm || || at  || || Van Cortlandt Park || W 16–4 || Sansone (5–0) || Knight (1–4) || — || 0 || 23–0 || 23–0 || Report
|- align="center" bgcolor="ddffdd"
| April 23 || 3:00 pm || || at Manhattan || || Van Cortlandt Park || W 12–4 || Noviello (5–0) || Mahoney (1–3) || — || 0 || 24–0 || 24–0 || Report
|- align="center" bgcolor="ddffdd"
| April 24 || 12:00 pm || || at Manhattan || No. 23 || Van Cortlandt Park || W 19–9 || Signore (4–0) || Muratalla (0–4) || — || 0 || 25–0 || 25–0 || Report
|- align="center" bgcolor="ddffdd"
| April 24 || 3:00 pm || || at Manhattan || No. 23 || Van Cortlandt Park || W 8–4 || Grabek (3–0) || Mahoney (1–3) || — || 0 || 26–0 || 26–0 || Report
|-

|- align="center" bgcolor="ddffdd"
| May 1 || 12:00 pm || SSN ||  || No. 23 || Alumni Baseball Diamond || W 2–1 || Sansone (6–0) || Bovair (3–4) || — || 65 || 27–0 || 27–0 || Report
|- align="center" bgcolor="ddffdd"
| May 1 || 3:00 pm || SSN || Siena || No. 23 || Alumni Baseball Diamond || W 10–1 || Noviello (6–0) || McCully (2–5) || — || 75 || 28–0 || 28–0 || Report
|- align="center" bgcolor="ffdddd"
| May 2 || 12:00 pm || SSN || Siena || No. 23 || Alumni Baseball Diamond || L 1–6 || Lumpinski (3–1) || Signore (4–1) || — || 65 || 28–1 || 28–1 || Report
|- align="center" bgcolor="ddffdd"
| May 2 || 12:00 pm || SSN || Siena || No. 23 || Alumni Baseball Diamond || W 4–0 || Cafaro (3–0) || Knapek (1–2) || — || 65 || 29–1 || 29–1 || Report
|- align="center" bgcolor="ddffdd"
| May 8 || 12:00 pm || ESPN3 || at  || No. 25 || Bobo Field || W 1–0 || Sansone (7–0) || Bruning (3–2) || — || 87 || 30–1 || 30–1 || Report
|- align="center" bgcolor="ddffdd"
| May 8 || 3:00 pm || ESPN3 || at Niagara || No. 25 || Bobo Field || W 4–1 || Noviello (7–0) || Jones (1–1) || Oliphant (3) || 85 || 31–1 || 31–1 || Report
|- align="center" bgcolor="ddffdd"
| May 9 || 12:00 pm || ESPN3 || at Niagara || No. 25 || Bobo Field || W 10–8 || Fitzgerald (1–0) || Hospital (2–1) || Grabek (4) || 86 || 32–1 || 32–1 || Report
|- align="center" bgcolor="ddffdd"
| May 9 || 3:00 pm || ESPN3 || at Niagara || No. 25 || Bobo Field || W 8–5 || Cafaro (4–0) || Smyth (0–2) || McVeigh (1) || 71 || 33–1 || 33–1 || Report
|-

|-

|-

|- align="center" bgcolor="ddffdd"
| May 20 || 11:00 am || ESPN+ || vs. (8)  || (1) No. 23 || Alumni Baseball Diamond || W 2–1 || Sansone (8–0) || Muratalla (3–5) || Cafaro (2) || 125 || 34–1 || 1–0 || Report
|- align="center" bgcolor="ddffdd"
| May 20 ||2:30 pm || ESPN+ || vs. (8) Manhattan || (1) No. 23 || Alumni Baseball Diamond || W 8–5 || Signore (5–1) || Solimine (1–4) || — || 125 || 35–1 || 2–0 || Report
|- align="center" bgcolor="ffdddd"
| May 26 ||11:00 am || ESPN+ || vs. (4) Canisius || (1) No. 23 || Alumni Baseball Diamond || L 1–4 || Duffy (3–0) || Sansone (8–1) || — || 225 || 35–2 || 2–1 || Report
|- align="center" bgcolor="ddffdd"
| May 27 ||11:00 am || ESPN+ || vs. (2)  || (1) No. 23 || Alumni Baseball Diamond || W 3–1 || Noviello (8–0) || Klepchick (4–4) || — || 150 || 36–2 || 3–1 || Report
|- align="center" bgcolor="ddffdd"
| May 28 || 9:30 am || ESPN+ || vs. (4) Canisius || (1) No. 23 || Alumni Baseball Diamond || W 8–2 || McLoughlin (2–0) || Fron (1–3) || — || 215 || 37–2 || 4–1 || Report
|- align="center" bgcolor="ffdddd"
| May 28 || 1:30 pm || ESPN+ || vs. (3)  || (1) No. 23 || Alumni Baseball Diamond || L 2–7 || Papeo (4–2) || Signore (5–2) || Stalzer (6) || 215 || 37–3 || 4–2 || Report
|-

|- align="center" bgcolor="ffdddd"
| June 4 || 7:00 pm || ESPN3 || vs. (2) No. 19 Arizona State* || (3) No. 25 || UFCU Disch–Falk Field || L 6–7 || Glenn (6–2) || Sansone (8–2) || — || 4,909 || 37–4 || 0–1 || Report
|- align="center" bgcolor="ddffdd"
| June 5 || 2:00 pm || ESPN3 || vs. (4) Southern* || (3) No. 25 || UFCU Disch–Falk Field || W 6–2 || Noviello (9–0) || Guienze (1–6) || — || 5,447 || 38–4 || 1–1 || Report
|- align="center" bgcolor="ddffdd"
| June 6 || 2:00 pm || ESPN3 || vs. (2) No. 19 Arizona State* || (3) No. 25 || UFCU Disch–Falk Field || W 9–7 || Sansone (9–2) || Corrigan (2–2) || Signore (2) || 6,981 || 39–4 || 2–1 || Report
|- align="center" bgcolor="ffdddd"
| June 7 || 2:00 pm || ESPN3 || at (1) No. 4 Texas* || (3) No. 25 || UFCU Disch–Falk Field || L 2–12 || Hansen (9–1) || Erbeck (0–1) || — || 6,853 || 39–5 || 2–2 || Report
|-

|-
| style="font-size:88%" |Legend:       = Win       = Loss       = Tie       = Canceled      Bold = Rhode Island team member     * Non-conference game
|-
| style="font-size:88%" | *Denotes non–conference game • Schedule source • Rankings based on the teams' current ranking in the NCBWA poll

Rankings

References

External links 
 2021 schedule

2021 Metro Atlantic Athletic Conference baseball season
2021
2021 in sports in Connecticut
2021 NCAA Division I baseball tournament participants